ERA-45 is a synthetic estrogen and a selective agonist of the ERα. It shows 286-fold selectivity for transactivation of the ERα over the ERβ, with EC50 values of 0.37 nM for the ERα (7-fold weaker than estradiol) and 13 nM for the ERβ (20,000-fold weaker than estradiol). However, another found only about 35-fold potency for transactivation of the ERα over the ERβ. The drug has no antagonistic activity at either receptor. ERA-45 induced prostate cancer development in preclinical models when it was given in combination with testosterone, whereas testosterone alone did not do so. In contrast, the selective ERβ agonist ERB-26 was protective against the development of prostate cancer produced by these two drugs. These findings suggest opposing roles of the ERα and ERβ in the prostate gland. The chemical structure of ERa-45 does not appear to have been disclosed.

See also
 16α-LE2
 ERA-63
 GTx-758
 Methylpiperidinopyrazole
 Propylpyrazoletriol

References

Drugs with undisclosed chemical structures
Synthetic estrogens